In Irish mythology, *Danu is the reconstructed mother goddess of the Tuatha dé Danann (Old Irish: "The peoples of the goddess Danu"). Though primarily seen as an ancestral figure, some Victorian sources also associate her with the land.

Etymology 
The hypothetical nominative form of the name, *Danu, is not found in any medieval Irish text, but is rather a reconstruction by modern scholars based on the genitive Danann (also spelled Donand or Danand), which is the only form attested in the primary sources (e.g. in the collective name of the Irish gods, Tuatha dé Danann "Tribe of the Gods of Danu"). In Irish mythology, Anu (sometimes written as Anann or Anand) is a goddess. She may be a distinct goddess in her own right or an alternative name for Danu, in which case Danu could be a contraction of *di[a] Anu ("goddess Anu").

The etymology of the name has been a matter of much debate since the 19th century, with some earlier scholars favoring a link with the Vedic water goddess Danu, whose name is derived from the Proto-Indo-European root *dʰenh₂- "to run, to flow", which may also lie behind the ancient name for the river Danube, Danuuius – perhaps of Celtic origin, though it is also possible that it is an early Scythian loanword in Celtic.

Linguist Eric Hamp rejects the traditional etymologies in his 2002 examination of the name Danu, and proposes instead that *Danu is derived from the same root as Latin bonus (Old Latin duenos) from Proto-Indo-European *dueno- "good", via a Proto-Celtic nominative singular n-stem *Duonū ("aristocrat").

In mythology
Danu has no surviving myths or legends associated with her in any of the medieval Irish texts.

Approximate matches Anu and Danand in Irish texts
Cormac's Glossary, a text that predates the Lebor Gabala Erenn (below), names the goddess Anu as the mother of the gods.

The closest figure in Irish texts to a Danu would then be Danand, daughter of Delbáeth. In the Lebor Gabála Érenn (The Book of the Taking of Ireland), it is noted the Tuatha dé Danann get their name from Danand's three sons: Brian, Iuchar, and Iucharba. These three are called the "Gods of Dannan".

Welsh parallels
She has possible parallels with the Welsh legendary figure Dôn in the medieval tales of the Mabinogion, whom most modern scholars consider to be a mythological mother goddess.

However, Dôn's gender is not specified in the Mabinogion, and some medieval Welsh antiquarians presumed Dôn to be male.

See also 
 Anu (Irish goddess)
 Danu (Asura)
 Dôn (Welsh deity)

Footnotes

References

External links
 

Earth goddesses
Irish goddesses
Mother goddesses